Sumas is a city in Whatcom County, Washington, United States. It had a population of 1,307 as of the 2010 census. Sumas is located adjacent to the Canada–U.S. border and borders the city of Abbotsford, British Columbia. The Sumas-Huntingdon port of entry at the north end of State Route 9 operates 24 hours a day. Sumas shares Nooksack Valley School District with the cities of Nooksack and Everson. It is the northernmost settlement on Washington State Route 9.

History
The area was home to the Nooksack Indians in the millennia prior to the arrival of the first permanent settler Robert Johnson in 1872.  
 It was called "Sumas" meaning "land without trees" or "big flat opening."  It is derived from a  Cowichan tribe who also resided in the region.

Originally called "Sumas City," the town was officially incorporated on June 18, 1891. A post office with that name has been in operation since 1897.

The town was a railroad hub and briefly supported the Mount Baker Gold Rush, with some gold mining operations still ongoing in the area such as at  Lone Jack Mine.  It as also known for a large rodeo in the early 20th Century, the "Sumas Roundup."

The area around Sumas drains into the Fraser River in Canada, in a broad floodplain. Floods from the  Nooksack and  Fraser rivers have been recorded ever since the area was settled.  Although not the largest flood to have occurred prior to 1990, the November 10 flood received notoriety as it caused millions of dollars in damage.

On November 15, 2021, another regional flood event resulted in catastrophic flooding in Sumas. Approximately 85 percent of homes in the city were damaged and hundreds of residents were rescued after a partial evacuation.

Geography

Due to a surveying error, part of Sumas lies above the 49th parallel and is thus the northernmost incorporated place in the contiguous United States.

Demographics

2010 census
At the 2010 census, there were 1,307 people, 482 households and 329 families living in the city. The racial makeup of the city was 83.7% White, 1.5% African American, 2.4% Native American, 1.5% Asian, 6.6% from other races, and 4.2% from two or more races. Hispanic or Latino of any race were 15.8% of the population.

There were 482 households, of which 39.8% had children under the age of 18 living with them, 49.6% were married couples living together, 11.6% had a female householder with no husband present, 7.1% had a male householder with no wife present, and 31.7% were non-families. 26.3% of all households were made up of individuals, and 6.4% had someone living alone who was 65 years of age or older. The average household size was 2.71 and the average family size was 3.27.

The median age in the city was 30.6 years. 28.8% of residents were under the age of 18; 12.1% were between the ages of 18 and 24; 27.2% were from 25 to 44; 21.3% were from 45 to 64; and 10.6% were 65 years of age or older. The gender makeup of the city was 49.2% male and 50.8% female.

2000 census
At the 2000 census, there were 960 people, 346 households and 236 families living in the city. The population density was 687.5 per square mile (264.8/km2). There were 401 housing units at an average density of 287.2 per square mile (110.6/km2). The racial makeup of the city was 86.15% White, 3.23% Native American, 4.17% Asian, 4.79% from other races, and 1.67% from two or more races. Hispanic or Latino of any race were 7.81% of the population.

There were 346 households, of which 39.9% had children under the age of 18 living with them, 51.2% were married couples living together, 11.3% had a female householder with no husband present, and 31.8% were non-families. 26.6% of all households were made up of individuals, and 9.2% had someone living alone who was 65 years of age or older. The average household size was 2.77 and the average family size was 3.42.

35.0% of the population were under the age of 18, 8.2% from 18 to 24, 29.0% from 25 to 44, 17.6% from 45 to 64, and 10.2% who were 65 years of age or older. The median age was 31 years. For every 100 females, there were 97.9 males. For every 100 females age 18 and over, there were 100.0 males.

The median household income was $29,297 and the median family income was $36,250. Males had a median income of $30,227 compared with $20,268 for females. The per capita income for the city was $13,497. About 13.9% of families and 18.0% of the population were below the poverty line, including 23.1% of those under age 18 and 14.9% of those age 65 or over.

Notable residents

 Gale Bishop, professional basketball player
 Harry Delmar Fadden, sailor and U.S. Medal of Honor recipient

Municipal services
The City of Sumas provides electricity to residents and businesses purchased from the 
Bonneville Power Administration, as well as offering water, sewer, and analog cable service 
including a mix of major Seattle networks, Canadian broadcast TV, expanded cable channels, and Showtime.

References

External links
 
 City website

Cities in Whatcom County, Washington
Cities in Washington (state)
Washington placenames of Native American origin